The 2016–17 Butler Bulldogs women's basketball team represented Butler University in the 2016–17 NCAA Division I women's basketball season. The Bulldogs, led by third year head coach Kurt Godlevske, played their home games at Hinkle Fieldhouse and were members of the Big East Conference. They finished the season 6–25, 2–16 in Big East play to finish in last place. They advance to the quarterfinals of the Big East women's tournament where they lost to Creighton.

Roster

Schedule

|-
!colspan=9 style="| Exhibition

|-
!colspan=9 style="| Non-conference regular season

|-
!colspan=9 style="| Big East Conference Play

|-
!colspan=9 style="|Big East Women's Tournament

See also
2016–17 Butler Bulldogs men's basketball team

References

Butler
Butler Bulldogs women's basketball seasons
Butler Bulldogs women's basketball
Butler Bulldogs women's basketball